1. FC Slovácko Ženy is a Czech women's football team from Uherské Hradiště, representing 1. FC Slovácko in the Czech Women's First League. Founded in 1991, it was called DFC Compex and based in Otrokovice (16 kilometers from Uherské Hradiště) before Slovácko bought it in 2006.

It is arguably the third best team in the country after Sparta Prague and Slavia Prague, having ranked 3rd in all six seasons from 2005 to 2011. Slovácko was the championship's runner-up in 2001 and 2002, and reached the national Cup's final in 2009 and 2018.

European Record

Current squad
As of 16 September 2022

Former internationals
 : Klára Cahynová, Iveta Dudová, Jitka Klimková, Kamila Dubcová, Michaela Dubcová

Former players

References

External links
 

Women's football clubs in the Czech Republic
Association football clubs established in 1991
1. FC Slovácko
1991 establishments in Czechoslovakia